Qaraməmmədli (also, Karamamedli) is a village and municipality in the Gadabay Rayon of Azerbaijan.  It has a population of 1,491.  The municipality consists of the villages of Qaraməmmədli, Dikdaş, and Kəsəmən.

References 

Populated places in Gadabay District